Disappear Here is the second studio album by the American alternative rock band Bad Suns. The album serves as a follow-up to their debut album Language & Perspective (2014)  The album was recorded with Eric Palmquist in Los Angeles, California in 2015 and was released on 16 September 2016 by Vagrant Records.

Track listing

Personnel 
Bad Suns
Gavin Bennett – bass
Christo Bowman – composer, guitar, vocals
Ray Libby – guitar
Miles Morris – drums

Production
 Eric Palmquist – engineer, mixing, production
 Steven Aguilar – engineer, mixing assistant
 Jake Munk – mixing assistant
 Joe LaPorta – mastering

Additional personnel
 Jeremy Berman – drum technician
 Dan Moore – drum technician
 Bruce Nelson – guitar technician

Artwork
 Kevin Circosta – art direction, design, photography
 Adam Alessi – band photo
 Randall Leddy – layout

Charts

References

2016 albums
Bad Suns albums
Vagrant Records albums